Halima Hachlaf (born 6 September 1988) is a Moroccan runner who specializes in the 800 metres. She is the younger sister of Abdelkader Hachlaf, an international steeplechase athlete. She won silver medals in the 800 m at the Mediterranean Games and Jeux de la Francophonie in 2009. Her personal best for the distance is 1:58.27.

Junior career
Hachlaf was born in Khénifra, and began her international career at an early age, competing in the 800 metres at the 2003 World Youth Championships in Athletics when she was fourteen. She qualified for the semi-finals but did not manage to finish the race. She had greater success at the 2004 World Junior Championships the following year, as she recorded a personal best of 2:06.44 in the heats and reached the event final, finishing ninth. In 2005, she entered the IAAF World Cross Country Championships for the first time and was 31st overall in the junior race. At the 2005 World Youth Championships she won her heat and recorded a season's best of 2:06.91 to finish as runner-up in the semi-final behind Teresa Kwamboka. She failed to repeat this form in the final and was fourth in a time of 2:08.61. At the end of the year she competed at the 2005 Jeux de la Francophonie, and won a bronze medal in the 4×400 metres relay.

She was first in the 400 metres at the African Northern Region Junior Championships in July 2006, but was beaten into second by Aicha Rezig in her speciality. She reached the semi-finals of the 2006 World Junior Championships in Athletics and ran at the 2007 IAAF World Cross Country Championships, taking 46th place. Later that year, she ran a personal best of 2:02.60 at a meeting in Biberach, Germany – a mark which made her the third fastest junior woman that year. She won two medals at the 2007 African Junior Championships in Athletics, taking the silver in the 800 m and a bronze in the 1500 metres. The highlight 2008 for Hachlaf was a fourth-place finish at the 2008 African Championships, where she finished in a time of 2:04.74 behind Agnes Samaria.

Senior breakthrough
The 2009 season brought significant improvements for Hachlaf. She set a new best time of 2:00.91 for the silver medal at the 2009 Mediterranean Games, although she was somewhat behind Elisa Cusma who set a Games record. She competed at her first global senior competition the following month, the 2009 World Championships in Athletics. Hachlaf recorded the fifth fastest qualifying time in the heats stage, but she did not manage to finish the semi-finals, dropping out mid-race. She closed her year with an appearance at the 2009 Jeux de la Francophonie, where she won another silver medal, just beaten by her compatriot Seltana Aït Hammou. On the final day of the competition she took the bronze medal for Morocco in the 4×400 m relay.

The Moroccan made her first global indoor appearance at the 2010 IAAF World Indoor Championships in March, but missed out on qualification in the heats stage. At the start of the outdoor season she scored an unexpected win over her compatriot Hasna Benhassi at the Meeting International Mohammed VI d'Athlétisme de Rabat in a personal best run of 2:00.63. A few days later she ran at the Golden Gala in Rome and had a significant victory over World Championship medallists Janeth Jepkosgei and Jenny Meadows. She comfortably won in a time of 1:58.40 at the Diamond League meeting, improving her best by over two seconds and scoring her first major win of her career.

Doping suspension
She served a 4-year competition ban, as a result of abnormalities in her biological passport, lasting from 14 October 2013 to 18 December 2017. This made her the second athlete in her family to receive a doping ban, as her brother Abdelkader Hachlaf was banned for doping in 2004.

Personal bests 

All information taken from IAAF profile.

Achievements

References

External links

1988 births
Living people
Moroccan sportspeople in doping cases
Olympic athletes of Morocco
Moroccan female steeplechase runners
Athletes (track and field) at the 2012 Summer Olympics
Doping cases in athletics
Moroccan female middle-distance runners
People from Khenifra
Mediterranean Games silver medalists for Morocco
Athletes (track and field) at the 2009 Mediterranean Games
Mediterranean Games medalists in athletics
Athletes (track and field) at the 2019 African Games
African Games competitors for Morocco
20th-century Moroccan women
21st-century Moroccan women